This Ole Boy is the sixth studio album by American country music singer Craig Morgan. It was released on Black River Entertainment on February 28, 2012.

Content
This Ole Boy is Morgan's first release for the independent Black River Entertainment. He told Billboard that he "felt like they had more going on, and more potential as an independent than anybody out there", and compared the label to Broken Bow Records, for which he recorded from 2002 to 2007.

The first single from the album is its title track, written by Rhett Akins, Dallas Davidson and Ben Hayslip, also known as the Peach Pickers. The song was previously recorded by Joe Nichols on his 2011 album It's All Good. Morgan co-wrote seven songs on the album and co-produced it with Phil O'Donnell. Morgan co-wrote with Shane Minor and Jeffrey Steele, two of the writers of his 2007 single "International Harvester", on "Corn Star", which was released as the album's second single, and ultimately peaked after five weeks at #50 on the country chart. The album's third single, "More Trucks Than Cars", debuted at #56 on the country chart for the week of September 15, 2012.

The album's release was preceded on November 1, 2011 by a digital-exclusive extended play also titled This Ole Boy, which comprises the title track, "The World Needs a Kitchen", "Fish Weren't Bitin'", "Show Me Your Tattoo" and "Better Stories".

Critical reception
Giving it three-and-a-half stars out of five, Country Weekly reviewer Jessica Nicholson said that his "standard good-ole-boy fare[…]finds Craig at his most confident and comfortable." An identical rating came from Matt Bjorke of Roughstock, who said that "Craig Morgan has certainly returned with a strong album worthy of becoming a collection of big hits."

Track listing

Personnel
Jim "Moose" Brown- keyboards
Tom Bukovac- electric guitar
Perry Coleman- background vocals
Chad Cromwell- drums
Shannon Forrest- drums
Kevin "Swine" Grantt- bass guitar
Kenny Greenberg- electric guitar
Rob Hajacos- fiddle
Tony Harrell- keyboards
Mike Johnson- steel guitar
Jeff King- electric guitar, soloist
James Mitchell- electric guitar
Craig Morgan- lead vocals
Phil O'Donnell- percussion
Russ Pahl- jews harp
Adam Shoenfeld- electric guitar
Joe Spivey- fiddle
Russell Terrell- background vocals
John Willis- acoustic guitar

Chart performance

Album

Singles

References

2012 albums
Craig Morgan albums
Black River Entertainment albums